Mystery plays and miracle plays (they are distinguished as two different forms although the terms are often used interchangeably) are among the earliest formally developed plays in medieval Europe. Medieval mystery plays focused on the representation of Bible stories in churches as tableaux with accompanying antiphonal song. They told of subjects such as the Creation, Adam and Eve, the murder of Abel, and the Last Judgment. Often they were performed together in cycles which could last for days. The name derives from mystery used in its sense of miracle, but an occasionally quoted derivation is from ministerium, meaning craft, and so the 'mysteries' or plays performed by the craft guilds.

Origins

As early as the fifth century living tableaux were introduced into sacred services.
The plays originated as simple tropes, verbal embellishments of liturgical texts, and slowly became more elaborate. At an early period chants from the service of the day were added to the prose dialogue. As these liturgical dramas increased in popularity, vernacular forms emerged, as travelling companies of actors and theatrical productions organized by local communities became more common in the later Middle Ages.

The Quem quaeritis? is the best known early form of the dramas, a dramatised liturgical dialogue between the angel at the tomb of Christ and the women who are seeking his body. These primitive forms were later elaborated with dialogue and dramatic action. Eventually the dramas moved from church to the exterior - the churchyard and the public marketplace. These early performances were given in Latin, and were preceded by a vernacular prologue spoken by a herald who gave a synopsis of the events. The writers and directors of the earliest plays were probably monks. Religious drama flourished from about the ninth century to the sixteenth.

In 1210, suspicious of the growing popularity of miracle plays, Pope Innocent III issued a papal edict forbidding clergy from acting on a public stage. This had the effect of transferring the organization of the dramas to town guilds, after which several changes followed. Vernacular texts replaced Latin, and non-Biblical passages were added along with comic scenes, for example in the Secunda Pastorum of the Wakefield Cycle. Acting and characterization became more elaborate.

These vernacular religious performances were, in some of the larger cities in England such as York, performed and produced by guilds, with each guild taking responsibility for a particular piece of scriptural history. From the guild control originated the term mystery play or mysteries, from the Latin ministerium meaning "occupation" (i.e. that of the guilds). The genre was again banned, following the Reformation and the establishment of the Church of England in 1534.

The mystery play developed, in some places, into a series of plays dealing with all the major events in the Christian calendar, from the Creation to the Day of Judgment. By the end of the 15th century, the practice of acting these plays in cycles on festival days was established in several parts of Europe. Sometimes, each play was performed on a decorated pageant cart that moved about the city to allow different crowds to watch each play as well as provided actors with a dressing room as well as a stage The entire cycle could take up to twenty hours to perform and could be spread over a number of days. Taken as a whole, these are referred to as Corpus Christi cycles. These cycles were often performed during the Feast of Corpus Christi and their overall design drew attention to Christ's life and his redemption for all of mankind.

The plays were performed by a combination of professionals and amateurs and were written in highly elaborate stanza forms; they were often marked by the extravagance of the sets and 'special effects', but could also be stark and intimate. There was a wide variety of theatrical and poetic styles, even in a single cycle of plays.

English mystery plays

There are four complete or nearly complete extant English biblical collections of plays. A collection is the York cycle of forty-eight pageants; there are also the Towneley plays of thirty-two pageants, the Ludus Coventriae, and the Chester cycle of twenty-four pageants, now generally agreed to be an Elizabethan reconstruction of older medieval traditions. Also extant are two pageants from a New Testament cycle acted at Coventry. Additionally, a fifteenth-century play of the life of Mary Magdalene, The Brome Abraham and Isaac and a sixteenth-century play of the Conversion of Saint Paul exist. Besides the Middle English drama, there are three surviving plays in Cornish known as the Ordinalia, and several cyclical plays survive from continental Europe.

These biblical plays differ widely in content. Most contain episodes such as the Fall of Lucifer, the Creation and Fall of Man, Cain and Abel, Noah and the Flood, Abraham and Isaac, the Nativity, the Raising of Lazarus, the Passion, and the Resurrection. Other pageants included the story of Moses, the Procession of the Prophets, Christ's Baptism, the Temptation in the Wilderness, and the Assumption and Coronation of the Virgin. In given cycles, the plays came to be sponsored by the newly emerging Medieval craft guilds. The York mercers, for example, sponsored the Doomsday pageant. Other guilds presented scenes appropriate to their trade: the building of the Ark from the carpenters' guild; the five loaves and fishes miracle from the bakers; and the visit of the Magi, with their offerings of gold, frankincense and myrrh, from the goldsmiths. The guild associations are not, however, to be understood as the method of production for all towns. While the Chester pageants are associated with guilds, there is no indication that the N-Town plays are either associated with guilds or performed on pageant wagons. Perhaps the most famous of the mystery plays, at least to modern readers and audiences, are those of Wakefield. Unfortunately, we cannot know whether the plays of the Towneley manuscript are actually the plays performed at Wakefield but a reference in the Second Shepherds' Play to Horbery Shrogys  is strongly suggestive. In "The London Burial Grounds" by Mrs Basil Holmes (1897), the author claims that the Holy Priory Church, next to St Katherine Cree on Leadenhall Street, London was the location of miracle plays from the tenth to the sixteenth century. Edmund Bonner, Bishop of London (c 1500 - 1569) stopped this in 1542.

Spanish mystery plays

The Misteri d'Elx (in English, the Elx Mystery Play or Mystery Play of Elx) is a liturgical drama dating from the Middle Ages which has been enacted and celebrated every year without any known interruptions. Commemorating the Assumption of Mary, it is played on every 14 and 15 August in the Basilica de Santa María in the city of Elx (also known as Elche). The prohibition of theatrical plays in churches by the Council of Trent eventually threatened to interrupt the yearly performance of the Misteri, but in 1632 Pope Urban VIII issued a special permit for its continuation. In 2001, UNESCO declared it one of the Masterpieces of the Oral and Intangible Heritage of Humanity.

The oldest liturgical drama (12th century) written already in old Spanish language was a codex found in the library of the Toledo Cathedral. The Auto de los Reyes Magos belongs to the Christmas cycle. It is a play about the Biblical Magi, three wise men from the East who followed a star and visited the baby Jesus in Bethlehem. It is believed to have been based on an earlier liturgical Latin play written in France.

Miracle play
Miracle plays, or Saint's plays, are now distinguished from mystery plays as they specifically re-enacted miraculous interventions by the saints, particularly St. Nicholas or St. Mary, into the lives of ordinary people, rather than biblical events; however both of these terms are more commonly used by modern scholars than they were by medieval people, who used a wide variety of terminology to refer to their dramatic performances. Robert Chambers, writing in the 19th century, notes that "especially in England, miracle [came] to stand for religious play in general".

Cornish language miracle plays were performed in plain-an-gwarrys. To capture the attention of the audience, "the plays were often noisy, bawdy and entertaining".

Modern performances
Mystery plays are still produced regularly throughout the United Kingdom. The local cycles were revived in both York and Chester in 1951 as part of the Festival of Britain, and are still performed by the local guilds. The N-Town cycle was revived in 1978 as the Lincoln mystery plays,
 and in 1994 the Lichfield Mysteries were revived (now the biggest community theatre event in the United Kingdom).

In 1977 the National Theatre commissioned Tony Harrison to create The Mysteries, a re-working of the Wakefield Cycle and others. It was revived in 1985 (whereupon the production was filmed for Channel 4 Television), and again as a part of the theatre's millennium celebration in 2000. The productions won Bill Bryden the "Best Director" title in both the 1985 Evening Standard Theatre Awards and the 1985 Laurence Olivier Awards, the year the three plays first appeared together in performance at the Lyceum Theatre. An adaptation of Harrison's play was staged at Shakespeare's Globe in 2011 as The Globe Mysteries.

In 2001, the Isango Ensemble produced an African version of the Chester Cycle at the Garrick Theatre in London as The Mysteries – Yiimimangaliso, performing in a combination of the Xhosa language, the Zulu language, English, Latin and Afrikaans. They revived an adapted version of the production at Shakespeare's Globe in 2015 as The Mysteries. In 2004, two mystery plays (one focusing on the Creation and the other on the Passion) were performed at Canterbury Cathedral, with actor Edward Woodward in the role of God. The large cast also included Daniel MacPherson, Thomas James Longley and Joseph McManners.

See also
Biblical Magi
Chester Mystery Plays
Easter Drama
Lincoln Mystery Plays
Liturgical drama
Medieval theatre
Mistero Buffo
Morality play - evolved from mystery plays
Nativity play
Passion play
Wakefield Mystery Plays - a collection of thirty-two mystery plays performed in medieval and early Renaissance England.
York Mystery Plays - a collection of forty-eight mystery plays

References

 Anderson Magalhães, Le Comédies bibliques di Margherita di Navarra, tra evangelismo e mistero medievale, in La mujer: de los bastidores al proscenio en el teatro del siglo XVI, ed. de I. Romera Pintor y J. L. Sirera, Valencia, Publicacions de la Universitat de València, 2011, pp. 171–201.

External links

 The Official Lincoln Mystery Plays Website
 The Official Chester Mystery Plays Website
 Records of Early English Drama (REED) at Victoria University of the University of Toronto
 The York Mystery plays
 2002 and 2006 York Mystery Plays
 2012 Lincoln Mystery Plays
 A simulator of the progress of the pageants in the York Mystery plays
 The Lichfield Mysteries 
 The York Cycle as performed in Toronto in 1998
 Medieval Imaginations: literature and visual culture in the Middle Ages
 Tewkesbury's Millennia of Mummers' Heritage kept alive - United Kingdom 
 Texts:
 The Towneley (Wakefield) Cycle in Middle English. Available from Michigan or Virginia
 The York Cycle in Middle English. Available from Michigan or Virginia 
 The York cycle modernised by Chester N. Scoville and Kimberley M. Yates
 The n-Town cycle  modernised by Stanley J. Kahrl and Alexandra F. Johnston
 The Chester Cycle in middle English
 

Christian plays
Drama
Cultural depictions of Herod the Great
Medieval literature
Theatre in the United Kingdom
Medieval drama
Religious vernacular drama
Theatrical genres